The 2015 Braintree District Council election was scheduled to take place on 7 May 2015 to elect members of Braintree District Council in England. This was on the same day as other local elections.

Following a boundary change, the number of wards was reduced from 30 to 26 and the number of councillors from 60 to 49.

Summary

Candidates by party

Results

|}

Ward results

Bocking Blackwater

Bocking North

Bocking South

Braintree Central & Beckers Green

Braintree South

Labour gained one of these seats at a 2012 by-election.

Braintree West

Bumpstead

Coggeshall

Gosfield & Greenstead Green

Great Notley & Black Notley

Halstead St. Andrew's

Halstead Trinity

Hatfield Peverel & Terling

Hedingham

Kelvedon & Feering

Rayne

Silver End and Cressing

Stour Valley North

Stour Valley South

The Colnes

Three Fields

Witham Central

Witham North

Witham South

Witham West

Yeldham

By-elections

Witham South

Witham North

Bumpstead

Bocking North

Hatfield Peverel and Terling

References

2015 English local elections
May 2015 events in the United Kingdom
2015
2010s in Essex